Glazikha is a rural locality (a village) in Kumzerskoye Rural Settlement, Kharovsky District, Vologda Oblast, Russia. The population was 11 as of 2002.

Geography 
Glazikha is located 52 km northwest of Kharovsk (the district's administrative centre) by road. Balukovskaya is the nearest rural locality.

References 

Rural localities in Kharovsky District